HMS Illustrious was a 74-gun third rate ship of the line of the Royal Navy, launched on 7 July 1789 at Bucklers Hard under the direction of Henry Adams. She participated in the Battle of Genoa after which she was wrecked.

Service

In 1793, Illustrious was involved in the Siege of Toulon.  In 1795, she earned a Battle Honour in the Battle of Genoa, during which Captain Nelson aboard  captured Ça Ira. Illustrious was badly damaged in the engagement with the van of the French fleet.

Loss

After the battle,  was towing Illustrious when she broke free of her tow. Then the accidental firing of a lower deck gun damaged the ship so that she took on water. She attempted to anchor in Valence Bay (between Spezia and Leghorn) to ride out the bad weather that had descended upon her. Her cables broke, however, and she struck on rocks and had to be abandoned. Lowestoffe and  took off her stores, and all her crew were saved. Her hull was then set on fire.

Notes

References

Lavery, Brian (2003) The Ship of the Line - Volume 1: The development of the battlefleet 1650-1850. Conway Maritime Press. .
Michael Phillips. Illustrious (74) (1789). Michael Phillips' Ships of the Old Navy. Retrieved 1 November 2008.
 

Ships of the line of the Royal Navy
Arrogant-class ships of the line
Shipwrecks in the Mediterranean Sea
1789 ships
Ships built on the Beaulieu River